Napoléon Kemner Laflamme,  (22 October 1865 – 10 August 1929) was a Liberal party member of the House of Commons of Canada. He was born in Lyster, Canada East, the son of Jacques K. Laflamme and Marie Gagné, and became a lawyer.

Laflamme was educated at the Séminaire de Québec and the Université Laval, was called to the Quebec bar in 1893 and set up practice in Montreal. In 1905, he was named King's Counsel. Laflamme was an unsuccessful candidate for a seat in the Quebec assembly in 1909. In the same year, he married Eugénie Surveyor. He was elected to Parliament at the Drummond—Arthabaska riding in the 1921 general election. After serving one term in the House of Commons, he left federal politics as of the 1925 federal election and did not seek re-election.

Laflamme was appointed to the Senate on 21 December 1927 and remained in that role until his death on 10 August 1929.

References

External links
 

1865 births
1929 deaths
Canadian senators from Quebec
Lawyers in Quebec
Liberal Party of Canada MPs
Liberal Party of Canada senators
Members of the House of Commons of Canada from Quebec
Canadian King's Counsel